The following is a complete episode list of the BBC television series Top Gear that ran from April 1977 to December 2001, a total of 524 episodes. After the cancellation of the series in 2001, the BBC were convinced into running a revamped show with a new format, which became the widely popular series of the same title launched in 2002.

Episodes
Top Gear was a series of programmes broadcast by the BBC covering motor related issues, new car model reviews, motor show previews, fuel economy, safety, the police, speeding, insurance, consumer advice and used car sales tips among other issues. Many presenters featured over the course of the series, most notably Angela Rippon, Noel Edmonds, William Woollard, Chris Goffey, Judith Jackson, Sue Baker, Tiff Needell, Jeremy Clarkson,  Quentin Willson and Vicki Butler-Henderson.

When it became a network show, it was broadcast on BBC 2 on Thursday nights for Series 1, then on Tuesday nights between Series 2 and Series 17, then reverting to the original Thursday timeslot from Series 18 to the end of its run. In all, 524 episodes (515 plus the nine regional shows) were broadcast between 1977 and 2002, with a large majority of that figure being Top Gear itself.

The original series of the Top Gear programme was broadcast in BBC Midlands region only. There were nine programmes, the first of which went out on BBC 1 Midlands, on 22 April 1977. The listing below does not include these original regional shows, it begins when the programme became a network transmission.

Note: The timeslots for Series 45 varied, so not all episodes were broadcast consecutively each week.

Spin-offs

Top Gear Rally Report 
Rally Report was a series of programmes broadcast by the BBC dedicated to broadcasting previews, highlights and reports of the Lombard RAC Rally of the United Kingdom, and latterly, the final round of the World Rally Championship. William Woollard presented in studio segments, whilst Sue Baker, or Tony Mason in later years, presented the location reports on the stages. There are sixty five episodes in all, produced between 1984 and 1998, including all specials, but excluding the preview of the 1995 RAC Rally, as the total episodes for that series is unknown.

Top Gear Motorsport 
Top Gear Motorsport was a series of programmes broadcast by the BBC covering various forms of motorsport such as the World Rally Championship, the British Rally Championship, British Formula Three, Formula Renault and Formula Vauxhall Junior racing, as well as British Superbike and Eurocar challenges. Tiff Needell presented the show throughout the show's run. The programme was broadcast weekly on a Friday timeslot. The show was broadcast between 1994 and 1998, and ninety four episodes were produced in all, including specials.

Top Gear Take 2 
Top Gear Take 2 was a series of programmes broadcast by the BBC looking back on previous segments of Top Gear over the years. Each programme ran for fifteen minutes on BBC Two, with repeats surfacing in 1997, on the then new UK Horizons. Presenters included Quentin Willson, Steve Berry, Jeremy Clarkson and Tiff Needell. The show was broadcast between 1992 and 1999, with fifty six episodes being produced.

Top Gear Waterworld 
Top Gear Waterworld was a series of programmes broadcast by the BBC covering water based vehicles, and various activities related to them, such as Citroën 2CV river racing in Brittany, and how to ease traffic congestion in London by using water transport on the River Thames. The series was presented by Jeremy Clarkson, Tiff Needell and Julia Bradbury. The show was broadcast in 1998, with five episodes being produced.

Top Gear GTi 
Top Gear GTi was a series of programmes broadcast by the BBC covering a variety of features such as car reviews, special features such as attending a driving school and motor shows. Essentially, GTi is an expansion on the main programme. The series was mainly presented by Vicki Butler-Henderson, although Steve Berry and Jason Bradbury appeared on the show at times. The show was the last of the spin off series' of Top Gear to be broadcast, airing between September 1999 and May 2001, with more than one hundred episodes in its name. Unlike any other spin off, Top Gear GTi was broadcast on a near daily timeslot on the UK Horizons channel.

Top Gear Specials 
Various specials of Top Gear were produced during the show's initial run, each of them having a particular theme to the show.

References

 
Lists of British non-fiction television series episodes